Wilfred Wrigley (born 4 October 1949) is an English former professional footballer,,,,, who played as a half back. Born in Clitheroe, he came through the Burnley youth team, and played in the side that won the FA Youth Cup in 1968. Wrigley made his senior debut on 23 November 1968 in the 0–2 defeat to Sunderland at Roker Park. He played four league matches in the 1968–69 season; all four games ended in defeat for Burnley, including a 0–7 defeat to Manchester City and a 1–6 loss away at Leeds United. Wrigley scored his first goal for the club in the 4–2 win against Crystal Palace on 11 October 1969. On 27 March 1970, he made his final appearance for Burnley in the 1–1 draw with Stoke City at Turf Moor. Wrigley left to go to University in September 1970. In Wilfred’s time in university he studied geology.

References

1949 births
Living people
People from Clitheroe
English footballers
Association football defenders
Burnley F.C. players
[[Category:Englis
 Football League players]]